The Ministry for Foreign Affairs is an Icelandic cabinet-level ministry founded 18 November 1941. The current Minister for Foreign Affairs is Þórdís Kolbrún R. Gylfadóttir. The Minister of Foreign Affairs takes care of the armed forces of Iceland, such as they are.

See also 

 Foreign Affairs Committee
 Foreign relations of Iceland

References

External links 
  
  

1941 establishments in Iceland
Iceland
Foreign relations of Iceland
Foreign Affairs
Iceland, Foreign Affairs
Iceland
Iceland